This is a list of French television related events from 2010.

Events
16 June - Luce Brunet wins the eighth series of Nouvelle Star. This was the final series to be broadcast on M6.
22 October - Benoit Dubois wins the fourth series of Secret Story.
22 December - 8-year-old dance couple Alex and Alizée win the fifth series of La France a un incroyable talent.

Debuts

Television shows

1940s
Le Jour du Seigneur (1949–present)

1950s
Présence protestante (1955-)

1970s
30 millions d'amis (1976-2016)

2000s
Plus belle la vie (2004–present)
La France a un incroyable talent (2006–present)
Secret Story (2007–present)
X Factor (2009-2011)

Ending this year
Nouvelle Star (2003-2010, 2012–present)

Births

Deaths

See also
2010 in France